Phaeomegaceros is a genus of hornworts in the family Dendrocerotaceae.  It includes seven species.

References

External links

Hornworts
Bryophyte genera